5-Aminoimidazole-4-carboxamide ribonucleotide (AICAR) is an intermediate in the generation of inosine monophosphate. AICAR is an analog of adenosine monophosphate (AMP) that is capable of stimulating AMP-dependent protein kinase (AMPK) activity. The drug has also been shown as a potential treatment for diabetes by increasing the metabolic activity of tissues by changing the physical composition of muscle.

Mechanism of action
The nucleoside form of AICAR, acadesine, is an analog of adenosine that enters cardiac cells to inhibit adenosine kinase and adenosine deaminase. It enhances the rate of nucleotide re-synthesis increasing adenosine generation from adenosine monophosphate only during conditions of myocardial ischemia. In cardiac myocytes, acadesine is phosphorylated to AICAR to activate AMPK without changing the levels of the nucleotides. AICAR is able to enter the de novo synthesis pathway for adenosine synthesis to inhibit adenosine deaminase causing an increase in ATP levels and adenosine levels.

Use as a performance-enhancing drug
In 2009, the French Anti-Doping Agency, suspected that AICAR had been used in the 2009 Tour de France for its supposed performance enhancing properties. Although a detection method was reportedly given to the World Anti-Doping Agency, it was unknown if this method was implemented. As of January 2011, AICAR was officially a banned substance in the World Anti Doping Code, and the standard levels in elite athletes have been determined, to interpret test results.

See also
 Inosine monophosphate synthase
 Nicotinamide riboside

References

Nucleotides
World Anti-Doping Agency prohibited substances